Choo-tai of Egham, was a Pekingese dog who was Best Champion at Cruft's in 1913. It was poisoned to death later that year, and it was subsequently claimed that the suffragette movement was responsible.

Show career
Choo-tai of Egham was owned by Miss Violet Ashton Cross, and lived with her at Lea House, Egham. At the Aylesbury and District Canine Society Show in October 1912, Choo-tai was named best Pekingese in a category sponsored by the Pekingese Club of Great Britain. He was subsequently named the second best dog in the show of any variety.

The dog was named the Best Champion at the Cruft's dog show in 1913. The dog was well known for being named the best dog in a variety of shows across country, during the course of his two year long show career it won more than 200 prizes. At one point, Miss Ashton Cross refused an offer of £1,500 to purchase him.

Death
Miss Ashton Cross took Choo-tai to compete at the Southampton dog show, where he was again named the best dog in the show. Prior to the show, Miss Ashton Cross had been warned that someone might attempt to poison the dog. Following judging the dog was returned to his pen, where it was presumed that a piece of poisoned liver had been left for him. The dog became sick over the following days, and died three days afterwards. She placed a reward of £100 for any information related to the death of the dog. A toy spaniel was also killed in a similar manner at the show.

The owner subsequently received a typed postcard claiming responsibility for the death of the dog in order to support the suffragette movement. It claimed further that any important animal prize winner from then on would be destroyed at their hands until women were given the vote. A doctor said that it would have taken a skilled practitioner to apply the correct dosage of poison.

References

Individual dogs
1913 animal deaths